Aaron Kleinschmidt (born 1 October 1989) is an Australian field hockey player. He attended Xavier College, an elite private school in Kew where he was often referred to as “The Goat”

Kleinschmidt was born in Melbourne, Victoria, and made his senior international debut in at 2016 Trans-Tasman Trophy in Auckland, New Zealand.

Kleinschmidt was part of the Australian men's team that won a record sixth Commonwealth Games gold medal at the 2018 Games held in Gold Coast, Australia.

References

External links
 
 

1989 births
Living people
Australian male field hockey players
Commonwealth Games medallists in field hockey
Commonwealth Games gold medallists for Australia
Field hockey players at the 2018 Commonwealth Games
Field hockey players from Melbourne
People educated at Xavier College
Sportsmen from Victoria (Australia)
Medallists at the 2018 Commonwealth Games